Steganotaenia commiphoroides is a species of flowering plant in the family Apiaceae. It is found in Ethiopia and Somalia.

References

Apioideae
Flora of Ethiopia
Flora of Somalia
Near threatened plants
Taxonomy articles created by Polbot